Mark David Mraz (born February 9, 1965) is a former professional American football player who was a defensive end in the National Football League (NFL), World League of American Football (WLAF) and the Canadian Football League (CFL). During his career he played for the Atlanta Falcons and Los Angeles Raiders of the NFL, the Frankfurt Galaxy of the WLAF, and the Hamilton Tiger-Cats of the CFL. Mraz played college football at Utah State University.

Professional career

Atlanta Falcons
Mraz was a fifth-round draft choice (125th pick overall) of the Atlanta Falcons in 1987. During his rookie season, he played in 11 of the 12 non-strike games and was primarily used on special teams but did record two quarterback sacks. Mraz was waived by the Falcons during the 1988 preseason and did not sign with another team during that campaign.

Los Angeles Raiders
In April 1989, Mraz signed with the Los Angeles Raiders, for whom he played in 11 games that year, recording 0.5 sacks.

Frankfurt Galaxy
The Frankfurt Galaxy selected Mraz in the second round (14th defensive lineman) of the 1991 WLAF positional draft. He finished the season with 6.5 sacks and earned first-team All-World League honors.

References

1965 births
Living people
Sportspeople from Glendale, California
American football defensive ends
Utah State Aggies football players
Atlanta Falcons players
Los Angeles Raiders players
Frankfurt Galaxy players
Hamilton Tiger-Cats players